Kiślaki may refer to the following places in Poland:
Kiślaki, Białystok County (north-eastern Poland)
Kiślaki, Mońki County (north-eastern Poland)